The 1904–05 season was the 32nd season of competitive football in Scotland and the 15th season of the Scottish Football League.

League competitions

Scottish League Division One

Celtic became the champions after a playoff victory against Rangers after the two teams finished level on points.

Champions: Celtic

The above table was slightly incorrect. Most reference books have the score for the game 19 November 1904 as Hearts 2 Port Glasgow Athletic 0. The actual score was 5–0. Report Therefore, Hearts should have 3 more goals and Port Glasgow 3 more in the against Column.
Incorrect version that appears in most reference books.

League Table from April 1905

Scottish League Division Two

Two teams were promoted from Division Two this season, as next season's Division One capacity increased to sixteen teams.

Other honours

Cup honours

National

County

Non-league honours

Senior
Highland League

Other Leagues

Scotland national team

Key:
 (H) = Home match
 (A) = Away match
 BHC = British Home Championship

Other national teams

Scottish League XI

Notes

See also
1904–05 Aberdeen F.C. season
1904–05 Rangers F.C. season

References

External links
Scottish Football Historical Archive

 
Seasons in Scottish football